Mary Beardslee Hinds (1874-1952) was an American First Lady of Guam.

Early life 
On July 4, 1874, Hinds was born as Mary May Miller Beardslee. Hinds' father was Hamilton White Beardslee (1840–1907). Hinds' mother was Lucy Putnam (nee Phelps Howson) Beardslee (1850–1926). Hinds had two siblings, Kenneth and Doris.

Career 
In 1913, when Alfred Walton Hinds was appointed the Naval Governor of Guam, Hinds became the First Lady of Guam on September 23, 1913, until March 28, 1914.

Personal life 
On April 10, 1902, at May Memorial Church in Syracuse, New York, Hinds married Alfred Walton Hinds (1874-1957), who later became a Naval officer and Naval Governor of Guam. Hinds' maid of honor was her sister Doris Beardslee; she also had four other bridesmaids. They had one son, Walton Beardslee Hinds (1904-1973). Hinds and her family lived in places such as New York, Bremerton, Washington, Guam, and Coronado, California.

In 1931, Hinds and her family moved to Coronado, California.

Hinds' son Walton Beardslee Hinds became a Commander of US Navy and became attached to USS Atlanta.

On December 18, 1952, Hinds died. Hinds is interred at Fort Rosecrans National Cemetery in Point Loma, San Diego, California.

References

External links 
 Fort Rosecrans National Cemetery, Point Loma, San Diego County, California at interment.net
 Ft Rosecrans National Cemetery, San Diego, San Diego County, California at usgwarchives.net
 Mary Beardslee Hinds at findagrave.com

1874 births
1952 deaths
First Ladies and Gentlemen of Guam
Burials at Fort Rosecrans National Cemetery
People from Bremerton, Washington
People from Coronado, California